James O'Brien (1824 – July 8, 1922) was a blacksmith and political figure in New Brunswick, Canada. He represented Charlotte County in the Legislative Assembly of New Brunswick from 1892 to 1903 as a Liberal member.

He was born in Windsor, Nova Scotia, the son of John O'Brien, an Irish immigrant, and Susan Sivewright, of Huguenot descent. O'Brien married Statira E. Nutter. He served as Scott Act inspector for the county. O'Brien lived in Saint George, New Brunswick.

References 
The Canadian parliamentary companion, 1897 JA Gemmill
The Irish In Early New Brunswick, Irish Canadian Cultural Association of New Brunswick

1824 births
1922 deaths
New Brunswick Liberal Association MLAs
Canadian people of Irish descent